Miliam Guerrib  (born 5 November 1985 in Rijeka) is a Croatian football player who currently is playing with SV Sedda Bad Schallerbach in the OÖ Liga.

References

External links
 

1985 births
Living people
Footballers from Rijeka
Association football forwards
Croatian footballers
NK Opatija players
NK Krk players
NK Crikvenica players
KF Skënderbeu Korçë players
KS Kastrioti players
NK Jadran Poreč players
Grazer AK players
SC Ritzing players
FC Wels players
Kategoria Superiore players
Austrian 2. Landesliga players
Austrian Regionalliga players
Austrian Landesliga players
Croatian expatriate footballers
Expatriate footballers in Austria
Croatian expatriate sportspeople in Austria
Expatriate footballers in Albania
Croatian expatriate sportspeople in Albania